Shereford is a small village and former civil parish, now in the parish of Dunton, in the North Norfolk district, in the county of Norfolk, England. It lies on the east bank of the River Wensum facing Dunton across the river. In 1931 the parish had a population of 97. On 1 April 1935 the parish was abolished to form Dunton.

The villages name means 'Bright/clear ford'.

Shereford St. Nicholas is one of 124 existing round-tower churches in Norfolk.

References

External links

St Nicholas on the European Round Tower Churches website

Villages in Norfolk
Former civil parishes in Norfolk
North Norfolk